Bron is a commune in the Metropolis of Lyon, Auvergne-Rhône-Alpes region, eastern France.

Geography 
It is the sixth-largest suburb of the city of Lyon, and is adjacent to its east side.

Climate

History
The earliest traces of life in Bron can be found in the cemetery and date from 71 BC. The town as it is today did not take shape until approximately 1812.

In mid-August 1944, prisoners from Montluc prison were taken to Bron Airfield where 109 of them, including 72 Jews, were killed in what would become known as Le Charnier de Bron ("The Charnel house of Bron").

Bron was spared much of the damage caused by the riots in many of France's suburbs in the 1990s, such as in Venissieux and Villeurbanne.

Population

Sights
The Fort de Bron, erected between 1872 and 1876, is part of the second belt of fortifications around Lyon.

Transport
Bron is served by the following TCL (Lyon public transport) services:

Metro
 Line D (Gare de Vaise to Gare de Vénissieux) – served by 2 stations (Mermoz-Pinel and Parilly) located on the boundary with Lyon.
Tram
 Line T2 (Perrache to Saint-Priest Bel-Air) – served by 8 stations.
 Line T5 (Grange-Blanche to Parc du Chêne, continuing to Eurexpo on exhibition days) – served by 7 stations.
Bus
 C8 (Grange Blanche - Vaulx-en-Velin Résistance)
 C9 (Bellecour Antoine Poncet - Hôpitaux Est)
 C15 (Laurent Bonnevay - Bachut Mairie du 8e)
 C17 (Charpennes - Laurent Bonnevay)
 24 (Bachut – Bron – Sept Chemins)
 25 (Cordeliers – Gare Part-Dieu – Montchat – Sept Chemins)
 26 (Bachut – Bron Aéroport – Manissieux)
 52 (Parilly Université Hippodrome - Vaulx-En-Velin La Grappinière)
 64 (Laurent Bonnevay – La Soie – Bron Droits de l'Homme)
 68 (Vaulx-en-Velin La Soie – Chassieu – Azieu)
 78 (Mermoz-Pinel – Parc du Chêne – Sept Chemins)
 79 (Grange Blanche – Bron – Décines or Chassieu)
 81 (Laurent Bonnevay – Bron – Porte des Alpes)
 82 (Vaulx-en-Velin La Soie – Bron – La Borelle)
 93 (Hôpital Feyzin Vénissieux - Porte des Alpes / Parc Technologique)
 Zi7 (Vaulx-En-Velin La Soie - Bron Droits De L'Homme)

Bron airportLyon-Bron Airport (technically located in the communes of Chassieu and Saint-Priest) has existed since 1920, although much of its commercial activity was diverted to Satolas (Saint-Exupéry International Airport), Lyon's main airport, in 1975.

Education
Bron is home to part of the University of Lyon 2. The Bron campus is located on the south-eastern edge of the town, close to the Parc de Parilly and Saint-Priest.

Notable residents

 Arthur Rozenfeld (born 1995), basketball player in the Israeli Basketball Premier League

Twin towns
Bron is twinned with:
 Cumbernauld, Scotland, United Kingdom
 Grimma, Germany
 Weingarten, Germany
 Talavera de la Reina, Spain

See also
 Communes of the Rhône department

References

External links

 Official website
 History of Bron (in French)

Communes of Lyon Metropolis
Dauphiné